Vecihi "John" Başarın (born 1947) is a Turkish Australian historian and author with a special interest in Gallipoli.  His research has been instrumental in bringing a Turkish perspective to Australian migration and the ill-fated ANZAC campaign.  He is a speaker on the subject of Gallipoli and has co-authored six books in both English and Turkish, used widely as resource material for schools, media, exhibitions and libraries. Başarın has written many articles and conference papers on his research and made guest appearances on television features and radio programs on Gallipoli.

For his outstanding service and individual efforts in uniting cultures, Başarın received the Victorian Premier's Award for Excellence in Multicultural Affairs in 2005.

In 2010, Başarın was recognised by the RSL as a contributor to understanding and world peace and awarded the ANZAC Peace Prize.  He is the only Australian Turk to be so honoured.

Early life and career
Başarın was born and raised in Istanbul, Turkey.  After completing his studies, he migrated to Australia in 1973 to pursue a career in Chemical Engineering. Working in the fields of energy and oil & gas engineering, Başarın has lived and worked in Australia, Norway, USA, Brazil, Germany and UK.  After many years in management, in 2002 he created his own consultancy.  His long term association with the Department of Industry saw Monash University award Başarın the title of Honorary Research Associate in 2003.

Gallipoli historian
Throughout his adult life, Başarın has maintained an interest of and study in the World War I campaign at Gallipoli.  His research has consistently explored both the ANZAC and Turkish viewpoints, detailed in the many publications he has co-authored.  Each year, Başarın leads Anzac Day tours and provides an insightful narrative to Gallipoli visitors.

For a decade, Başarın was involved with the AE2- Australian submarine project.  Acting as Turkish advisor to the 25-strong team, he travelled to Turkey to survey the submarine in 2007.  His brainchild AE2 Plaque Project has been implemented in Sydney, Fremantle and at Gallipoli.

Başarın has been working as a Research Fellow with Prof John Hall of Deakin University Business School, publishing research papers such as:
 Reflections on Anzac Day : from one millennium to the next, 2010
 An empirical analysis of attendance at a commemorative event: Anzac Day at Gallipoli, 2010

In March 2012, he has completed his doctoral studies on matters relating to motives of attendance at the Anzac Day commemorative events at Gallipoli. Dr Basarin's PhD thesis is titled "Battlefield Tourism: Anzac Day commemorations at Gallipoli- An Empirical Analysis".

ANZAC Peace Prize
Announced in April annually, The ANZAC Peace Prize is awarded by the RSL to "recognise any outstanding effort by an Australian citizen who has promoted the concept of international understanding and who, in so doing, has made a contribution to world peace." In 2010, the RSL ANZAC Awards Committee awarded The ANZAC Peace Prize to Vecihi Başarın "in recognition of his sustained and enthusiastic commitment to promote relationships between Australia and other communities around the world, particularly in Turkey, with a significant emphasis on his commitment to Rotary Youth Exchange programs and building understanding of the Gallipoli Campaign."

Awards and recognition

 2015 Order of Australia OAM Medal 
 2010 ANZAC Peace Prize
 2005 Victorian Premier's Award for Excellence in Multicultural Affairs
 2003 Monash University Honorary Research Associate

Books

With Hatice Başarın
Published by Allen and Unwin:
 The Turks in Australia, Melbourne, 1993
 Beneath the Dardanelles; The Australian submarine at Gallipoli, Sydney, 2008

With Dr Kevin Fewster and Hatice Başarın
 A Turkish View of Gallipoli, Melbourne, 1985
 Gallipoli – The Turkish Story, Sydney, 2003
 Gelibolu 1915, Istanbul, 2005
 Canakkale Bogazinin Derinliklerinde, Istanbul, 2009
 Gallipoli - The Invasion, Istanbul, 2015

References

External links 
 The Age Newspaper Article
 Deakin University Publication List
 Australian War Memorial Resources
 Vecihi Başarın Profile
 Submission to the Parliament of Australia Senate Finance and Public Administration Committee
 The Morning Show Transcript
 Parliament of Australia Senate Inquiry into matters relating to the Gallipoli Peninsula
 Brighton Grammar Student Exchange Program
 Battle of Lone Pine cited as reference
 Gallipoli: The First Day cited as reference
 Gallipoli and the ANZACS: a resource for secondary schools cited as reference
 HMAS AE2 - The Silent Anzac Project Brief March 2010 cited as reference

1947 births
Living people
20th-century Turkish historians
Writers from Istanbul
Turkish emigrants to Australia
21st-century Turkish historians